Nagendra Nath Tripathi is an Indian politician currently serving as the Regional General Secretary (Organization) of the Bhartiya Janata Party Bihar-Jharkhand region. He has been a pracharak for the Rashtriya Swayamsewak Sangh. He forms a bridge between Rashtriya Swayamsevak Sangh and Bhartiya Janata Party.

Early life and political career
Nagendra Nath Tripathi was born on 1 March 1955 in Belauli village of Sant Kabir Nagar (then a part of Basti), Uttar Pradesh. Born into a family of farmers, he is the eldest among the five children to Girjapati Tripathi and Ganesha Devi. During his higher secondary school days in Basti, he joined the local shakha of the Rashtriya Swayamsevak Sangh as a swayamsevak(member).

He went on to become a full-time pracharak, poornkaalik. He was then transferred to Bharatiya Janata Party(BJP). After serving for a long period of about eight years as the General Secretary (Organisation) of the BJP Uttar Pradesh unit, and then as the General Secretary (Organisation) of the BJP Bihar Pradesh unit.

References

External links 
 
 

1955 births
Living people
Bharatiya Janata Party politicians from Uttar Pradesh